Group D of the 2015 Africa Cup of Nations was played from 20 January until 28 January in Equatorial Guinea. The group consisted of Ivory Coast, Mali, Cameroon, and Guinea. Ivory Coast and Guinea advanced as group winners and runners-up respectively, while Mali and Cameroon were eliminated.

Teams

Notes

Standings

In the quarter-finals:
Ivory Coast advanced to play Algeria (runner-up of Group C).
Guinea advanced to play Ghana (winner of Group C).

Matches
All times local, WAT (UTC+1).

Ivory Coast vs Guinea
Guinea took the lead in the 36th minute when Mohamed Yattara smashed home a headed clearance from the Ivory Coast defence. Gervinho was sent off in the 58th minute for hitting Naby Keïta in the face, but the 10-men Ivory Coast equalized in the 72nd minute, as Wilfried Bony controlled the ball on his chest and passed to Seydou Doumbia to score.

Mali vs Cameroon
Mali took the lead in the 71st minute as Molla Wagué's flick-on from a free kick allowed Sambou Yatabaré to score at the far post. Cameroon equalized in the 84th minute, after Ambroise Oyongo controlled Raoul Loé's lofted pass to score from close range.

Ivory Coast vs Mali
Mali took the lead in the 7th minute, as Bakary Sako scored home from Sambou Yatabaré's cross. Ivory Coast equalized in the 86th minute, when Serge Aurier passed to Max Gradel to score.

Cameroon vs Guinea
Cameroon took the lead in the 13th minute, when Benjamin Moukandjo's corner evaded everybody and hit the goalkeeper to go into the net. Guinea equalized in the 42nd minute, as Ibrahima Traoré received a pass from Issiaga Sylla, and shot home from outside the penalty area.

Cameroon vs Ivory Coast
The only goal of the match was scored by Max Gradel in the 35th minute, as he stole the ball from the Cameroon defence, dribbled inside and shot home from outside the penalty area. The win sent Ivory Coast to the quarter-finals as group winners, while Cameroon were eliminated.

Guinea vs Mali
Guinea took the lead in the 15th minute with a penalty by Kévin Constant, which was awarded due to a handball by Salif Coulibaly. Mali then were awarded their own penalty three minutes later after Baissama Sankoh was penalised for handball, but Seydou Keita's penalty was easily saved. Mali equalized in the 47th minute, when Abdoulay Diaby crossed for Modibo Maïga to head home. The match finished in a 1–1 draw, the same scoreline as both Guinea and Mali's previous two matches, meaning that the two teams were tied on head-to-head record, overall goal difference, and overall goals scored. A drawing of lots were held the next day to decide which team qualify for the quarter-finals as group runner-up, which was won by Guinea (see below for details).

Drawing of lots
Guinea and Mali finished level on the second spot after the group stage, making the first drawing of lots needed at the tournament since 1988. Unlike some other international tournaments, 2015 Africa Cup of Nations tournament regulations would not use fair-play criteria or a penalty shoot-out after the teams met on the last match day to determine the final group ranking. Both head coaches have openly criticised the regulations.

The draw took place at 16:00 WAT (UTC+1) on 29 January 2015, at the Hilton Malabo. Representatives of each team drew a ball, one of which was numbered '2' and the other numbered '3'. Guinea drew the ball '2' and were placed as runners-up in the group, with Mali being third. As such, Guinea advanced to the quarter-finals and Mali were eliminated.

References

External links
Orange Africa Cup Of Nations, Equatorial Guinea 2015, CAFonline.com

Group D
Group
2015 in Cameroonian football